Manya Mahajanangale is a 1985 Indian Malayalam film,  directed by A. T. Abu and produced by Alavi N. The film stars Mammootty, Chithra, Prem Nazir and Adoor Bhasi in the lead roles. The film has musical score by Shyam.

Cast
Mammootty as Devan
Chithra as Vimala
Prem Nazir as Nizar Ahammed
Adoor Bhasi as Vakachan
Sabitha Anand aa Suhra
Seema as Sainu
T. G. Ravi as Raghavan
Mala Aravindan as Onthu Keshavan 
Philomina as Ayisha 
Kuthiravattam Pappu as Kuttans
Shanavas as Tony
Tony as College student 
Cochin Haneefa as Basheer
Kunjandi as Master Krishnan Nair
Rajan Padoor as Politician

Soundtrack
The music was composed by Shyam and the lyrics were written by Poovachal Khader.

References

External links
 

1985 films
1980s Malayalam-language films
Films directed by A. T. Abu